Fortierville is a municipality in the Centre-du-Québec region of the province of Quebec in Canada.

See also
List of municipalities in Quebec

References

External links

Municipalities in Quebec
Incorporated places in Centre-du-Québec
Designated places in Quebec
Canada geography articles needing translation from French Wikipedia